is a district of Chūō-ku, Kobe-shi, Hyogo, Japan. Today, it is the biggest downtown area in the city. The district takes the name from Sannomiya Shrine, a branch of Ikuta Shrine. 

Before the 1920s, Sannomiya was just an edge of the city. The major downtowns were Motomachi and Shinkaichi, which are west of Sannomiya. However, after Sogo Department Store moved to the place in front of Sannomiya Station from Motomachi in 1933, the area started to develop rapidly.

Sannomiya is also a hub of many transportation systems in Kobe. JR West, Hankyu Railway, Hanshin Electric Railway, Kobe Municipal Subway, and Kobe New Transit use Kobe-Sannomiya Station as their core station in the area.

The Kobe Incident in 1868 occurred in this district, in front of Sannomiya Shrine.

See also
Daimaru Kobe (diagonally in front of the above-mentioned Sannomiya Shrine)
Kobe-Sannomiya Station (Hankyu, Hanshin, Kobe Municipal Subway, Kobe New Transit)
Sannomiya Station (JR West)

Shopping districts and streets in Japan
Tourist attractions in Kobe
Geography of Kobe